In 2013 there were two tennis tournaments which were known as the 2013 Trabzon Cup:

 2013 Trabzon Cup (1), which began on 2 September
 2013 Trabzon Cup (2), which began on 9 September

See also
 Trabzon Cup